A term meaning 'leader' or 'boss', from the Hawaiian kahuna (priest or expert) and discussed there.

Big Kahuna may refer to:
 The Big Kahuna (film)
 Big Kahuna Burger, a fictional restaurant in films by Quentin Tarantino and Robert Rodriguez
 The Big Kahuna Rams, a Canadian Junior Football team
 Several games by Reflexive Entertainment:
 Big Kahuna Reef, a puzzle game
 Big Kahuna Reef 2, sequel to the puzzle game
 Big Kahuna Words, a boggle-style puzzle game
 Big Kahuna Party, a WiiWare game
 Big Kahuna, a water slide at the Darien Lake Theme Park Resort
 Big Kahuna, a wave pool at Noah's Ark Waterpark
 Big Kahuna's, a waterpark in Destin, FL
 Brian Ching (b. 1978), American soccer player
 Duke Kahanamoku (1890–1968), Hawaiian swimmer, actor and businessman
 Jon Miller (b. 1951), American baseball announcer
 Roby Yonge (1943–1997), American radio disc jockey (eastern U.S.)

See also 
 Kahuna (disambiguation)